Mike Flater (born January 22, 1951 in Evanston, Illinois) is a retired U.S. soccer forward who spent six seasons in the North American Soccer League.  He was also a member of the 1972 U.S.Olympic soccer team and earned fifteen caps with the U.S. national soccer team between 1975 and 1977.

College
Flater attended the Colorado School of Mines.  In addition to playing soccer, he also played as a placekicker on the school’s football team.  In 1973, he scored a 63-yard field goal.  The Washington Redskins drafted Flater in the ninth round of the 1974 NFL Draft.

NASL
The San Jose Earthquakes of the North American Soccer League (NASL) drafted Flater in the 1974 NASL college draft.  He did not sign with the Earthquakes, but in 1975 signed with the Denver Dynamos.  That season, Flater scored ten goals in fifteen games with the Dynamos.  At the end of the 1975 season, the Dynamos moved to Minnesota where the team was renamed the Minnesota Kicks.  Flater made the move with the team and spent the next two seasons in Minnesota.  However, his scoring pace dropped to one goal in twelve games in 1977 and he moved to the Oakland Stompers for the start of the 1978 season.  He saw time in only four games with Oakland before being traded to the Portland Timbers.  In twenty-two games with the Timbers, he scored seven goals as Portland went to the NASL semifinals.  However, Flater suffered a major knee injury which put him out of the 1979 season.  He attempted a comeback in 1980, but played only three games with the Timbers before retiring.

National and Olympic Teams
In 1971, Flater joined the U.S. Olympic team as it began qualification for the 1972 Summer Olympics.  A tie with El Salvador on September 18, 1971, put the U.S. into the games.  However, the team tied once and lost twice, eliminating it from the tournament.

Flater made his debut with the U.S. national team in 1975.  His first game came when he started a June 24, 1975 loss to Poland.  His next game did not come until September 24, 1976.  He then became a regular through the rest of the games in 1976 and 1977.  His last match came on October 10, 1977, in a win over China.  In fifteen matches with the U.S., Flater never scored a goal.

References

External links
 NASL stats

1951 births
Living people
Sportspeople from Evanston, Illinois
American soccer players
United States men's international soccer players
Footballers at the 1972 Summer Olympics
Olympic soccer players of the United States
North American Soccer League (1968–1984) players
Denver Dynamos players
Minnesota Kicks players
Oakland Stompers players
Portland Timbers (1975–1982) players
Players of American football from Illinois
Soccer players from Illinois
Colorado Mines Orediggers men's soccer players
Colorado Mines Orediggers football players
Association football forwards